Desperate Measures may refer to:

Film and TV

Film
 Desperate Measures (film), a 1998 action thriller film

Television
Episodes
 "Desperate Measures", second episode of the 1965 Doctor Who serial The Rescue
 "Desperate Measures" (Stargate SG-1), a 2001 TV episode
Series

 Desperate Measures (2013 American TV series), narrated by Orlagh Cassidy
 Desperate Measures (2013 Australian TV series), a documentary series about Indigenous Australians
 Desperate Measures (2022 TV series), starring Amanda Abbington

Music
  Desperate Measures (Hollywood Undead album), a 2009 album
 Desperate Measures (Leeway album), a 1991 album
 "Desperate Measures" (song), a 2012 song by Marianas Trench

Other uses 
 Desperate Measures (musical), a 2004 musical by David Friedman and Peter Kellogg